Scratched may refer to:

Film
Scratched (1916 film)
Scratched (2005 film) with Steven O'Donnell (Australian actor)

Music
Scratched, album by Justin Tranter
Scratched (Jesus Jones album), compilation album for the Japan market
"Scratched", song by Belita Woods on French DJ/producer  Étienne de Crécy 's Tempovision album

See also
Scratch (disambiguation)